The Taravo is a river on the island of Corsica, France. Its source is in the mountainous middle of the island, southeast of Monte Renoso. It flows generally southwest, through Palneca, Cozzano and Guitera-les-Bains. It ends in the Mediterranean Sea in Serra-di-Ferro, west of Propriano. Its entire course is in the Corse-du-Sud département.

References

Rivers of Corse-du-Sud
Rivers of France
Coastal basins of the Mediterranean Sea in Corsica